Michaël Llodra and Nicolas Mahut were the defending champions, but Llodra chose not to participate this year.  Mahut played alongside Vasek Pospisil, but lost in the first round to Julien Benneteau and Édouard Roger-Vasselin.
Jean-Julien Rojer and Horia Tecău won the title, defeating Jamie Murray and John Peers in the final, 3–6, 6–3, [10–8].

Seeds

Draw

Draw

Qualifying

Seeds

Qualifiers
  Colin Fleming /  Jonathan Marray

Lucky losers
  Jamie Murray  /  John Peers

Qualifying draw

References
 Main Draw
 Qualifying Draw

ABN AMRO World Tennis Tournament - Doubles
2015 ABN AMRO World Tennis Tournament